This is a list of governors of the Indian state of Haryana, which was carved out  from Punjab on 1 November 1966.

Governors of Haryana

See also
 Haryana
 Governors of India

References

External links
 Raj Bhavan, Haryana

 
Haryana
Governors